Camiguin, officially the Province of Camiguin (Kamigin: Probinsya ta Kamigin), is an island province in the Philippines located in the Bohol Sea, about  off the northern coast of Mindanao. It is geographically part of Region X, the Northern Mindanao Region of the country and formerly a part of Misamis Oriental province.

Camiguin is the second-smallest province in the country in both population and land area after Batanes. The provincial capital is Mambajao, which is also the province's largest municipality in both area and population.

The province is famous for its sweet lanzones, to which its annual Lanzones Festival is dedicated and celebrated every third weekend of October. It is home to lush interior forest reserves, collectively known as the Mount Hibok-Hibok Protected Landscape, which has been declared by all Southeast Asian nations as an ASEAN Heritage Park. The province also boasts three National Cultural Treasures, namely, the Old Bonbon Church ruins in Catarman, the Sunken Cemetery of Catarman, and the Spanish-era watchtower in Guinsiliban. The three sites were declared for “possessing outstanding historical, cultural, artistic and/or scientific value which is highly significant and important to the country and nation.”

Additionally, the island province has numerous Important Cultural Treasures, such as the Old Mambajao Fountain - situated in the town's rotonda, the Old Mambajao Municipal Building, the façade of the Santo Rosario Church in Sagay, and 14 heritage and ancestral houses. The sites were declared for “having exceptional cultural, artistic and historical significance to the Philippines.” All cultural treasures were declared by the National Commission for Culture and the Arts. There have been moves to establish a dossier nomination for the province to be included in the UNESCO World Heritage List.

History

Etymology
The name Camiguin is derived from the native word Kamagong, a species of ebony tree that thrives near Lake Mainit in the province of Surigao del Norte, the region from which the earlier inhabitants of the islands, the Manobos, originated. Kamigin, the local dialect of Camiguin, is the northernmost variant of the Manobo languages.

An earlier Spanish geography book spells the island as Camiguing. There is reason to suppose the Spaniards dropped the final g, given how the phoneme  does not exist in Spanish. Today it is rendered as Camiguín.

Classical era
The island of Camiguin is believed to have been first inhabited by the Manobo people of Surigao del Norte, as evidenced by the distinctly connected language between the two groups. The island was used as a trading stop point by various merchants and traders from the Rajahnate of Butuan, the Kedatuan of Dapitan, the ancient people of the Anda peninsula, and possibly the Rajahnate of Cebu and the animist Maranao of Lanao before the Islamization of the Lanao provinces.

Spanish colonial era
Old Spanish documents indicate that the renowned explorers Ferdinand Magellan and Miguel Lopez de Legaspi landed in Camiguin in 1521 and 1565, respectively. The first Spanish settlement was established in 1598 in what is now Guinsiliban. Guinsiliban, which comes from the old Kinamiguin word Ginsil-ipan (which means “to look out for pirates from a watchtower”) has an old Spanish watchtower where the Camiguinons kept watch for Moro pirates.

The first major Spanish settlement, established in 1679, was called Katagman or Katadman (known as Catarman). The settlement grew and prospered but was destroyed by the eruption of Mt. Vulcan in 1871. The former location is what is now Barangay Bonbon of Catarman.

Sagay, located south of Catarman, was formally established as a town in 1848. The word Sagay is derived from the name of poisonous fruit trees that grow in the area. Mambajao became a town in 1855. The name was coined from the Visayan terms mamahaw, meaning to usher breakfast, and bajao, which is leftover boiled rice. In the early 1900s, Mambajao prospered and became the busiest port in Northern Mindanao. Mahinog was established as a municipality in 1860. The name Mahinog comes from a Visayan word meaning "to ripen" or "to become ripe". Although Guinsiliban was the oldest settlement in the island, it was only in 1950 that it became a municipality. Mahinog was formerly governed by Mambajao while Guinsiliban was formally governed from Sagay.

American colonial era

In 1901, in the middle of the Philippine–American War, American soldiers landed in Camiguin to assume political control over the island. A group of Camiguinons, armed with bolos and spears, led by Valero Camaro, fought them in a short battle in Catarman. Valero Camaro was killed by a bullet in the forehead. Further study is needed before he and his band can be recognized as patriots in the same way we recognize the Katipuneros. There is no study that identifies an independence movement in Camiguin during the American occupation. However, a small detail with regards to the colonial resistance in Cagayan, Misamis indicates that Camiguinons supported in a clandestine way the revolutionary activities of the Cagayanons against the new colonizers. They offered their arms and ammunitions and a typewriter to the revolucionarios in Cagayan.

In 1903, the first public school in Camiguin was built in Mambajao but what is known today as the Mambajao Central School was completed in 1912. On September 9, 1904, the first public water system, known as Las Aguas Potables de Mambajao, spearheaded by an admired civic leader by the name of Placido Reyes and co-operated by townspeople, was inaugurated.<ref name="bar"

World War II
On June 18, 1942, the Japanese Imperial Army landed in Camiguin and set up a government in Mambajao. They gutted central Mambajao in reprisal to guerrilla activities in the area. The remains of some of these buildings still exist today.

Independence
On July 4, 1946, the Philippines gained independence from the US. Camiguin was then part of Misamis Oriental. 

On June 22, 1957, Camiguin formally became a subprovince of Misamis Oriental through Republic Act No. 2021 signed by President Carlos P. Garcia.

Finally, on June 18, 1966 Camiguin was made into a separate province  through Republic Act No. 4669 signed by President Ferdinand E. Marcos, and formally inaugurated in 1968.

Camiguinon citizens were among those who were victims of the human rights abuses during Martial law under Ferdinand Marcos; some of them were among the Northern Mindanaoans whose grievances were formally recognized and granted the right to reparations in 2014.

Geography
The province consists primarily of Camiguin Island, as well as a few other surrounding minor islets including:

Physical
As of the August 1, 2007, census, the province has a fifth-class income classification with a population of 81,293.

Administrative divisions
Camiguin comprises five municipalities, which are further subdivided into a total of 58 barangays.

Demographics

The people of Camiguin are called Camiguingnon or Camiguinon. Cebuano is the most spoken language in the province, although Kinamigin is considered to be the indigenous language. Today, Kinamigin is still spoken by a few people in the municipalities of Sagay and Guinsiliban. Tagalog and English are also widely spoken and understood by the local population.

Indigenous people 
An indigenous people group, the Cinamiguin Manobo, are believed to have been the first inhabitants of Camiguin. Their language, known as Kamigin, had 26,700 speakers as of the 2000 census.

Religion
Camiguin is a predominantly Roman Catholic province with 95% adherence. The remaining religions are represented by various Protestant and a few Islamic groups.

Economy

The economy is based upon fishing and farming, with copra providing the greatest income contribution. Lanzones has since then became the main agricultural product of the island province. Other agricultural products are abaca, rice, mangoes and other fruit trees. The growing tourism industry has improved the economy of the province. Small cottage industries have increased in number to accommodate the influx of visitors.

Education
Camiguin has three colleges, all located in Mambajao: Fatima College of Camiguin (FCC), Camiguin Polytechnic State College (CPSC), with a satellite campus in Catarman, and Camiguin School of Arts and Trades (CSAT). A complete secondary and elementary education is provided as well, both in private and public schools. There are also day care centers offering nursery and pre-school education.

The province has a total number of 68 day care centers managed by the Department of Social Welfare and Development (DSWD) and 56 public and private elementary schools. There are 13 secondary schools, 3 private institutions and the rest government-owned. There is one special school, which accommodates underprivileged or special children, the Family-to-Family School and Farm, which is managed by a Non-Government Organization (NGO).

The Technical Education and Skills Development Authority (TESDA) also offers vocational courses, as well as the Alternative Learning System Education Sector which helps individuals through its literacy and livelihood program.

Man-made attractions

Lanzones Festival
Each year in the third week of October, a festival is held to celebrate the Lanzones (locally called bwahan/buahan), a small grape-sized tropical fruit grown all over the island. Lanzones grown in Camiguin is considered to be the sweetest. The unique flavor is due to the richness of the volcanic soil. The week-long Lanzones Festival is one of numerous colorful events in the Philippines.

Churches
Several centuries-old Spanish Colonial and 20th century churches are found in various parts of the island.

 Santo Rosario Church: The Santo Rosario Church in the municipality of Sagay was built in 1882. The facade of the church is a declared Important Cultural Property of the Philippines.
 Old Bonbon Church Ruins of Catarman: The church of the Old Bonbon was destroyed and partly submerged by volcanic debris during the eruption and formation of Mount Vulcan from 1871 to 1875. Also known as Gui-ob Church, only the ruins of the church and bell tower remain of the old town. A modern white lighthouse was recently erected close to the bell tower. The archaeological site has been declared as a National Cultural Treasure of the Philippines.
 Baylao Church: The Church located in Barangay Baylao in Mambajao is claimed to be miraculous and the saving of many lives during the last volcanic eruption of Hibok-hibok is attributed to it.

Old ancestral homes
Beautiful and ornate ancestral homes dating back to the Spanish Colonial Period and American Colonial Period are still abundant and can be found along the streets of Camiguin. Fourteen of these heritage houses have been declared as Important Cultural Properties of the Philippines. These include the Borromeo ancestral house, Bacut ancestral house, Luspo ancestral house, Neri ancestral house, Nery ancestral house, Nerio-Chan ancestral house, Corrales ancestral house, Corrales y Gamali ancestral house, Francisco ancestral house, Juni ancestral house and Lim ancestral house, and Catalino Chan and Eleuterio Chan ancestral houses.

Other structures
The province is dotted with numerous heritage structures and zones from the classical, Spanish, and American eras, but most of its heritage sites are from the 300-year Spanish colonial era.

Sunken Cemetery of Catarman – an ancient cemetery which sank beneath the sea due to a volcanic eruption. The archaeological site has been declared as a National Cultural Treasure of the Philippines.
Spanish-era watchtower in Guinsiliban – the watchtower of Guinsiliban was one of the most important in the area during the Spanish colonial era. The watchtower has been declared as a National Cultural Treasure of the Philippines.
Old Mambajao Fountain – a unique-style fountain from the Spanish era. It has been declared an Important Cultural Property of the Philippines.
Old Mambajao Municipal building – a well-preserved Spanish-era government building which has been declared an Important Cultural Property of the Philippines.

Natural attractions

Volcanoes

The island of Camiguin is of volcanic origin composed of four stratovolcanoes. Each volcano (except Mount Guinsiliban) is made up of several flank domes. The only volcano on the island with historical eruptions is Hibok-Hibok, which last erupted in 1953.

Below is the list of volcanoes, arranged with respect to location from north to south:

 Mount Hibok-Hibokand Mount Vulcanare the northernmost and the only active volcanic vents on Camiguin. Mount Vulcan, ironically known as the Old Volcano [], is actually the youngest volcano on the island, starting as a fissure vent in 1871 on the northwestern flank of Mount Hibok-Hibok [] (see Volcanic eruption below). As a parasitic cone of Hibok-Hibok, it is still considered part of the volcano. Some of the other flank domes of the volcano are Carling Hill, Tres Marias Hills and Piyakong Hill. Ilihan Crater is the site of the 1950 eruption.
 Mount Timpoong is the largest mountain on Camiguin. Some of the flank vents on Mount Timpoong are Campana Hill and Minokol Hill.
 Mount Butay, also known as Mount Uhay, is located between the towns of Mahinog and Guinsiliban.
 Mount Guinsiliban is located in the town of Guinsiliban. The  mountain is the southernmost volcano and the first seen coming from the port of Balingoan on mainland Mindanao.

Islands
Located just a few kilometers off the coast are the two islands of Camiguin.

Springs
Ardent Hibok-Hibok Hot Spring — At the foot of Hibok-Hibok Volcano flow the mineral pools of Ardent Hot Springs. Wisps of steam can be seen rising from the running waters heated by the cauldron of the mountain, the most recently active of the seven volcanoes on the island.
Santo Niño Cold Springs and Bura Natural Soda Water Swimming Pool in Catarman are other popular places to get a relaxing dip on the island.
Tangub Hot Spring is an interesting hot spring located on the shore close to the Sunken Cemetery. Most of the spring is submerged and can be partly seen during low tide. The spring can also be examined by scuba diving or snorkeling, as visibility is excellent and it is also a recommended spot for observing underwater life.

Sunken cemetery
During the volcanic birth of Mt. Vulcan lasting from 1871 to about 1875, some areas in the town of Bonbon subsided, sinking the cemetery of the town to below sea level. The place is commemorated by a huge cross erected in 1982.

Since then the municipality of Bonbon has been transferred to the town of Catarman.

Waterfalls
An invigorating dip in the pool is popular, especially on warmer days, and there are also several hiking trails within the park. This is the favorite jump-off point for trekkers and mountaineers in search of adventure on the slopes of Mt. Timpoong.
Unfortunately, accessing the falls no longer entails a scenic hike passing through the Barrio of Mainit, Catarman and along the rocky river bed. The local government, to accommodate local tourism, decided in 2012 to improve access to the falls with a road built all the way up to the falls, which was finished in late 2014. Cars may be parked near the waterfalls, and from there it's just a few minutes to reach the falls and the pool. The pool at the base of the waterfall is deep and clear. As of March 2015, the local government is finalizing construction of the "Trans Island Highway", a road crossing Camiguin from Catarman to Mambajao which runs directly to the left of Tuasan Falls.

Protected areas
Timpoong and Hibok-Hibok Natural Monument — Located in the central and western portions of Camiguin, the natural monument preserves an important watershed and center of biodiversity in the Mount Hibok-Hibok and Timpoong ranges. As the island's only remaining forest, it supports the vast majority of the island's endemic and endangered flora and fauna such as the Camiguin hanging parrot, Camiguin hawk-owl and Camiguin forest mouse.
Giant Clam Sanctuary — Established by a non-government organization called Kabila Giant Clam Conservation and Ocean Nursery, this area is home to various species of corals and giant clams. Currently, 7 out of 9 species of giant clams can be found in the sanctuary.

Biodiversity

At least five vertebrate species are believed to be endemic to Camiguin:
Bullimus gamay, or the Camiguin forest rat
Apomys camiguinensis, the Camiguin forest mouse
Loriculus camiguinensis, the Camiguin hanging parrot
Oreophryne nana, or the Camiguin narrow-mouthed frog
Ninox leventisi, or the Camiguin hawk-owl

Transportation

 Both Cebu Pacific and Philippine Airlines serve daily flights from Mactan Cebu International Airport to Camiguin Airport and vice versa.
 Visitors may fly to Laguindingan Airport in Cagayan de Oro in Misamis Oriental province, the gateway to Northern Mindanao. From the airport, a shuttle ride ferries visitors to the Agora Bus Terminal in Cagayan de Oro. Eastbound buses take visitors to the port of Balingoan, Misamis Oriental in about two hours.  The ferries to Benoni port take just over an hour (depending on weather conditions) and have more scheduled trips as it takes passengers closer to Mambajao. The time between trips varies during the day and runs from 4:00 am to 5:00 pm.
 A Super Shuttle Roro transports passengers daily from Camiguin's Port of Balbagon to Bohol's Port of Jagna and vice versa.

Natural calamities

Volcanic activity from 1871 to 1875
On February 16, 1871, earthquakes began to be felt on the island, which increased in severity until April 30, when a volcanic fissure opened up 400 yards southwest of the village of Catarman, northwest of Hibok-Hibok Volcano. Mt. Vulcan was born and continued erupting and pouring lava into the sea, at the same time gaining in height and width. In 1875, the Challenger expedition visited the area and described the mountain as a dome,  in height, without any crater, but still smoking and incandescent at the top.

The town of Catarman was destroyed and a portion of the town sank beneath the sea. The settlement moved to where the town center is presently located. All that remains today of old Catarman are the ruins of the ancient Spanish church, a convent, and a bell tower.

Eruptions from 1948 to 1951
From 1948 to 1951, Mt. Hibok-Hibok was constantly rumbling and smoking. The first minor eruption in 1948 caused little damage and loss of life, but in 1949, a larger eruption caused 79 deaths due to pyroclastic flows. The largest eruption occurred in the morning of December 4, 1951. The volcano unleashed lava flows, poisonous gases, and pyroclastic flows destroying nearly 19 square kilometers of land, particularly in Mambajao. All in all, over 3,000 people were killed. Before the eruption of Mt. Hibok-Hibok in 1951, the population of Camiguin had reached 69,000. After the eruption, the population was reduced to about 34,000 due to massive out-migration.

Typhoon of 2001
A disastrous typhoon hit the province in the dawn of November 7, 2001. The tropical storm named Lingling (local name Nanang) brought buhawi (torrential downpours) on the mountains, causing multiple massive mudslides which killed about 200 inhabitants, most of whom were missing.

See also
 List of volcanoes in the Philippines
 List of islands in the Philippines

References

External links

 
 
 Province of Camiguin official website
 Map of Camiguin from Visayan Silent Gardens
 Lanzones Festival Camiguin Island
 

 
Provinces of the Philippines
Island provinces of the Philippines
Provinces of Northern Mindanao
States and territories established in 1966
1966 establishments in the Philippines
Bohol Sea
Former sub-provinces of the Philippines